Nil Fyodorovich Filatov (or , – ) was a medical doctor who is considered the founder of Russian paediatrics. His nephew Vladimir Filatov was a prominent ophthalmologist.

Career 
Having graduated from the Moscow University, he practised as a country doctor in his native region. In 1872–1874, Filatov took additional training in Vienna, Berlin, Heidelberg, and Prague. In 1876, he upheld a thesis on bronchitis and pneumonia, and obtained a doctor degree.

Nil Filatov is most famous for describing infectious mononucleosis (also known as Filatov's disease) in 1887 and Dukes' disease (sometimes referred as Dukes-Filatov disease) in 1885; he was also one of the first to observe Koplik's spots (1895). In cooperation with Georgy Gabrichevsky he introduced serumal treatment of diphtheria in 1894.

He created a number of handbooks on paediatrics, which were not only popular in Russia, but also translated into German, French, Italian, Czech and Hungarian. In 1892, Filatov established the Society of Paediatricians in Moscow.

The oldest children's hospitals in Moscow (where Filatov worked, now #13), and in Russia (#5, based in St. Petersburg) are named after him.

External links  
 
 Biography by the 1st MSMU 

1847 births
1902 deaths
People from Lyambirsky District
People from Saransky Uyezd
Scientists from the Russian Empire
Physicians from the Russian Empire
Pediatricians from the Russian Empire
Moscow State University alumni